National Highway 373, commonly referred to as NH 373 is a national highway in India. Its old name was NH 75. It is a secondary route of National Highway 73.NH-373 runs in the state of Karnataka in India. Starting point is AIT Circle, Chikkamagaluru and ending point is Bilikere and connected Cities are Chikkamagaluru, Hassan, Holenarasipura.

Route 
NH373 connects Chikkamagaluru, Belur, Hassan, Holenarasipura,Krishnarajanagara and Bilikere in the state of Karnataka.

Junctions  

  Near AIT Circle, Chikkamagaluru
  Terminal near Belur.
  near Hassan
  Terminal near Bilikere.

See also 
 List of National Highways in India
 List of National Highways in India by state

References

External links 

 NH 373 on OpenStreetMap

National highways in India
National Highways in Karnataka